Queensbury is a London Underground station in Queensbury, London. It is on the Jubilee line, between Canons Park and Kingsbury stations, and in Travelcard Zone 4.

History
The station opened on 16 December 1934, two years after the neighbouring stations, as part of the Metropolitan line and with its branch was transferred to the Bakerloo line in 1939, and then the Jubilee line in 1979.

The name Queensbury did not, when it was chosen, refer to any pre-existing area. It was coined by analogy with the adjacent Kingsbury station. Most of the locale now known as Queensbury is actually to the north-west of the tube station, in the London Borough of Harrow, just across the borough border from the tube station, which is in the London Borough of Brent.

Connections
London Buses routes 79, 114, 288 and 324, night route N98 and non-TFL routes 614 and 644 serve the station.

The Hive Stadium
Since 2013 and together with Canons Park station, Queensbury station is the next Tube station for "The Hive Stadium", the new football ground of Barnet FC, that is located 400 metres north along the railway tracks.

Trivia

The station, and its local surroundings and characters were cited in the song "Queensbury Station" by the Berlin-based punk-jazz band The Magoo Brothers on their album "Beyond Believable", released on the Bouncing Corporation label in 1988. The song was written by Paul Bonin and Melanie Hickford, who both grew up and lived in the area.

References

Gallery

Jubilee line stations
London Underground Night Tube stations
Tube stations in the London Borough of Brent
Railway stations in Great Britain opened in 1934